Sunil Nayar is an Indian American television writer and producer, most notable for his work on CSI: Miami. For its third season onward, Nayar has been appointed main-showrunner and executive producer of the ABC television series Revenge. He currently oversees two CBS Television Studios/Warner Bros. Television co-productions The Red Line and All Rise.

TV work includes 
 Oz
 "Next Stop, Valhalla" (2002)
 "Wheel of Fortune" (2002)
 "See No Evil, Hear No Evil, Smell No Evil" (2003)
 "Sonata da Oz" (2003)
 "A Day in the Death..." (2003)
 CSI: Miami:
 "Complications" (2004)
 "Innocent" (2004)
 "Murder in a Flash" (2004)
 "Speed Kills" (2004)
 "Shootout" (2005)
 "Money Plane" (2005)
 "Vengeance" (2005)
 "Blood in the Water" (2005)
 "Under Suspicion" (2005)
 "Silencer" (2006)
 "Rampage" (2006)
 "Rio" (2006)
 "Curse of the Coffin" (2006)
 "Triple Threat" (2007)
 "Born to Kill" (2007)
 "Inside Out" (2007)
 "Raising Caine" (2007)
 "Down to the Wire" (2008)
 "The DeLuca Motel" (2008)
 ”Flightrisk” (2009)
 Three Rivers
 ”Good Intentions” (2009)
 ”Case Histories” (2010)
 Body of Proof
 "Buried Secrets" (2011)
 "Hard Knocks" (2011)
 "Sympathy for the Devil" (2012)
 Revenge
 "Forgiveness" (2012)
 "Collusion" (2013)
 "Masquerade" (2013)
 "Fear" (2013)
 "Exodus" (2013)
 "Payback" (2014)
 "Revolution" (2014)
 "Execution" (2014)
 "Renaissance" (2014)
 The Red Line
 "I Must Tell You What We Have Inherited" (2019)
 All Rise
 "Sweet Bird of Truth" (2019)
 "Uncommon Women and Mothers" (2019)
 4400
 "Group Efforts" (2022)
 "Present is Prologue" (2022)

External links
 

American male writers of Indian descent
American people of Malayali descent
Living people
Year of birth missing (living people)
American television producers
American male screenwriters
American television writers
American male television writers